"Lucky Now" is a song by alt country singer-songwriter Ryan Adams, and the lead single from his studio album Ashes & Fire. According to Adams, the single is based upon "my time in New York in my twenties."

Background and composition
According to Adams, an early version of the song was about Cardinals bassist Chris Feinstein, who died in December 2009. In August 2011, Adams stated: 

Adams elaborated further, "It's the second draft of the song that I wrote for Chris Feinstien. [...] I think it was really fantastic, it was a good thing for me to write. Eventually, because I sat around with it, "Lucky Now" came around."

Musicians
Drums: Jeremy Stacey
Bass: Gus Seyffert
Piano: Norah Jones
B3 Hammond: Benmont Tench
Guitars: Ryan Adams

Charts

References

2011 songs
2011 singles
Ryan Adams songs
Song recordings produced by Glyn Johns
Capitol Records singles
Music videos directed by Philip Andelman
Songs written by Ryan Adams